Race for Glory (also known as American Built) is a 1989 American action film directed by Rocky Lang. The film stars Alex McArthur, Peter Berg, Pamela Ludwig, Ray Wise, Oliver Stritzel and Barbara Blossom in the lead roles. The score was composed by Jay Ferguson.

Plot 
Dirt track racer Cody Gifford along with his best friend and crew chief Chris Washburn, neighbor Alex Vogt, and girlfriend Jenny Eastman, have built a 500cc superbike in their garage. They take it to the American qualifiers,  Despite his bike falling over, he keeps up with two-time German world champion Klaus Kroeter on a factory Samurai, until Gifford and Kroeter crash. After Gifford sets a faster time than Kroeter at the Czechoslovakian time trials, the Belgian Grand Prix begins. Kroeter wins ahead of Mike Baldwin, Wayne Gardner, and Gifford, who finishes fourth. After this, Gifford accepts an offer to become Kroeter's teammate at Samurai where he is to be a blocker, leaving his friends behind. After Kroeter wins Yugoslavia ahead of Eddie Lawson and Gifford, Kroeter wins Germany ahead of Gifford and Ron Haslam. The Austrian Grand Prix begins. Kroeter takes the lead with Gifford and Italian rider Lalo Giacomo right behind. Kroeter causes Gifford and Giacomo to crash. Giacomo gets hit in the leg by Eddie Lawson and ends up with a broken leg. Gifford quits and returns home only to find that his father, Joe, has died. Joe's last letter says he wanted Cody to win the Grand Prix. Gifford then reunites with his friends and girlfriend to rebuild the bike, this time with an American flag paint scheme so that the engine will not overheat. The French Grand Prix then begins. After several bikes overheat, Gifford is in second, right behind Kroeter. Kroeter's engine blows up on the last turn and Gifford wins, followed by Mike Baldwin, Wayne Gardner, Eddie Lawson, Randy Mamola, and Kroeter, who finishes sixth. Gifford is the new champion and he, Cody, Jenny, and Alex  celebrate.

Cast
 Alex McArthur
 Peter Berg
 Pamela Ludwig
 Ray Wise
 Oliver Stritzel
 Barbara Blossom
 Steve Carlisle
 Jerome Dempsey
 Scott J. Fisher

References

External links
 
 

American action films
American auto racing films
Motorcycle racing films
1989 films
1989 action films
1980s English-language films
1980s American films
English-language action films